Western Aviation is Aircraft Charter Company based in Dubai. It provides charter flights for corporates and leisure travelers between the Middle East, Europe, Asia, Africa, Russia, CIS Countries and other famous destinations like Maldives, Mauritius and Seychelles.

History
Western Aviation was started in the year 2005. Western Aviation is part of Western Group of Companies whose parent company is Dubai based multinational business conglomerate ETA Ascon Star Group of companies, which has around 150 associated offices and branches in 22 countries, employing over 72,000 people with an annual turnover of around 5 Billion US Dollars.

Private jet aircraft
Western Aviation provides the following Private Jet Aircraft/Helicopters Sales and Leasing, Charter Brokerage and Appraisals on a Global basis.

Light jets
 Citation Jet II, Bravo
 Citation Jet III, VII
 Beechcraft Premiet 1A

Midsized jets
 Hawker 900XP
 Hawker 850XP
 Hawker 800XP
 Cessna Citation Sovereign
 Bombardier LearJet 60XR

Heavy jets
 Bombardier Challenger 604
 Bombardier Challenger 601
 Bombardier Global Express
 Embraer Legacy 600
 Gulfstream GIII
 Gulfstream G450
 Gulfstream GV

References

Airlines of the United Arab Emirates
Airlines established in 2005
Charter airlines